Jump the Gun is the third studio album by the Danish hard rock/heavy metal band Pretty Maids. It was released on 20 April 1990 in Europe by CBS. In the US, the title was changed to Lethal Heroes and it was released by Epic Records. The album was produced by Deep Purple's bass guitarist Roger Glover. According to CBS, it was then the most expensive album recording to date in Denmark, with a cost of around DKK 3–3.5 million. Jump the Gun was nominated for Danish Heavy Rock Album of the Year at the 1991 Danish Grammy Awards, but lost to Skagarack's A Slice of Heaven.

Due to the underwhelming commercial performance of Jump the Gun, three members left the band by late 1990 leaving only the lead singer Ronnie Atkins and the guitarist Ken Hammer. The band has said on numerous occasions that the decision to hire Glover as the album's producer was a mistake and led to its over-produced sound. In 2014, Atkins called the album his least favourite.

"Hang Tough" is a song that was written and recorded for Icon's Night of the Crime album but was not included in the final release. Icon's version is only available on the 1984: Live Bootleg CD and DVD.

Track listing

Personnel
Ronnie Atkins - lead vocals
Ken Hammer - lead guitar
Ricky Marx - guitar
Phil Moorhead - drums
Allan Delong - bass guitar
Alan Owen - keyboards

Additional musicians
Ian Paice - drums on "Young Blood"
Roger Glover - bass guitar on "Dream On"
Ivan Pedersen - backing vocals
Knud Linhard - backing vocals
Freddy George Jensen - harp on "Dream On"
The New Jersey Mass Choir appears on "Savage Heart"

References

External links

1990 albums
Pretty Maids albums
Albums produced by Roger Glover
Albums with cover art by Joe Petagno
Columbia Records albums